Cryptotaxidae is an extinct family of conodonts in the order Ozarkodinida. It includes the extinct genus Cryptotaxis.

Bibliography 
 Gilbert Klapper et Graeme M. Philip, « Devonian Conodont Apparatuses and their Vicarious Skeletal Elements », Lethaia, Wiley-Blackwell, vol. 4, no 4, octobre 1971, p. 429-452 ( et ,)

References

External links 

Ozarkodinida families
Devonian conodonts
Devonian first appearances
Devonian extinctions